The 1991 Saint Louis Billikens men's soccer team represented Saint Louis University during the 1991 NCAA Division I men's soccer season. The Billikens played their first season in the now-defunct Great Midwest Conference, where they were the inaugural regular-season and tournament champions. Saint Louis earned an automatic bid to the 1991 NCAA Division I men's soccer tournament, where they had their best NCAA tournament appearance since 1974. Saint Louis reached the College Cup before losing to the eventual national champions, Virginia. 

Saint Louis were led by future United States men's national soccer team striker Brian McBride, who led Saint Louis with 20 goals throughout the season. McBride later had a professional career playing with Columbus Crew and Chicago Fire in Major League Soccer as well as with Fulham in the Premier League. Additionally, the 1991 team contained future professionals players and coaches: Mike Sorber, Shane Battelle, Steve Kuntz and Rory Dames.

Roster

Schedule 

|-
!colspan=6 style=""| Regular season
|-

|-
!colspan=6 style=""| GMC Tournament
|-

|-
!colspan=6 style=""| NCAA Tournament
|-

|-

External links 
 Final 1991 Statistics  

Saint Louis
1991
1991 in sports in Missouri
NCAA Division I Men's Soccer Tournament College Cup seasons
Saint Louis Billikens
Saint Louis